The Pollokshields Burgh Hall is a municipal building at the edge of Maxwell Park, Glasgow, Scotland. The burgh hall, which was briefly the headquarters of Pollokshields Burgh Council, is a Category A listed building.

History
The building was commissioned and endowed for future maintenance by the politician, Sir John Stirling Maxwell of Pollok House, as a gift for the people of Pollokshields. The site he selected in Glencairn Drive had formed part of the Old Pollok Estate, which had been home to the Maxwell family for over 700 years.

The burgh hall was designed by Harry Edward Clifford in the Scottish Baronial style and built with dark red sandstone from the Ballochmyle Estate in Ayrshire. A ceremony was held at which Maxwell laid a memorial stone to commemorate the opening of the burgh hall and also the opening of Maxwell Park, which he had also gifted to the local people, on 25 October 1890. The design involved an asymmetrical main frontage facing Glencairn Drive; the main hall, which projected forward was on the left; the right bay featured a gabled porch with a round-headed doorway on the ground floor and a tower above; there was a bartizan on the right hand corner of the tower.

The building was initially used as a masonic meeting place by masonic lodge no. 772 and was also briefly used as the headquarters of the independent burgh of Pollokshields until 1891 when the burgh was absorbed into the city of Glasgow in 1891. It was extended in 1935.

After functioning as a day centre for Glasgow Corporation and then, from 1975, for Strathclyde Regional Council, it was deemed surplus to requirements in 1982 and acquired the Pollokshields Burgh Hall Trust for a nominal sum in 1986. Following refurbishment by the trust it reopened for community use in 1997. The lower ground floor was refurbished and converted for conference use with financial support from the National Heritage Memorial Fund in the late 1990s. The actress, Keira Knightley, attended her brother's wedding at the hall in April 2011.

Architecture

See also
List of listed buildings in Glasgow/10

References

External links

City chambers and town halls in Scotland
Category A listed buildings in Glasgow
Masonic buildings in Scotland
Listed government buildings in Scotland
Government buildings in Glasgow
1890 establishments in Scotland
Pollokshields
Government buildings completed in 1890
Masonic buildings completed in 1890